The Yugoslav Handball Championship was the highest level competition in men's team handball in the Socialist Federal Republic of Yugoslavia, played regularly for almost four decades between 1953 and 1992, before being abandoned due to the breakup of Yugoslavia.

History
The first five editions from 1953 to 1957 were decided via a finals play-off tournament contested by clubs who had qualified in regional competitions, before a regular round-robin league format was introduced for the 1957–58 season. The league featured clubs from all of Yugoslavia's federal subjects, with the most successful being RK Bjelovar with 9 titles, followed by RK Borac Banja Luka and RK Metaloplastika with 7 titles each.

Following the dissolution of Yugoslavia in the early 1990s, the competition was eventually succeeded by the following handball leagues:
 Handball Championship of Bosnia and Herzegovina
 Croatian Handball Premier League
 Macedonian Handball Super League
 Montenegrin Men's Handball First League
 Serbian Handball Super League
 Slovenian First League

Title holders

 .....1953  Prvomajska
 .....1954  Prvomajska
 .....1955  Crvena zvezda
 .....1956  Crvena zvezda
 .....1957  Zagreb
 1957–58  Partizan Bjelovar 
 1958–59  Borac Banja Luka 
 1959–60  Borac Banja Luka 
 1960–61  Partizan Bjelovar 
 1961–62  Zagreb
 1962–63  Zagreb
 1963–64  Prvomajska/Medveščak
 1964–65  Zagreb
 1965–66  Medveščak
 1966–67  Partizan Bjelovar
 1967–68  Partizan Bjelovar
 1968–69  Crvenka
 1969–70  Partizan Bjelovar
 1970–71  Partizan Bjelovar
 1971–72  Partizan Bjelovar
 1972–73  Borac Banja Luka 
 1973–74  Borac Banja Luka 
 1974–75  Borac Banja Luka 
 1975–76  Borac Banja Luka 
 1976–77  Partizan Bjelovar
 1977–78  Željezničar Sarajevo
 1978–79  Partizan Bjelovar
 1979–80  Slovan
 1980–81  Borac Banja Luka 
 1981–82  Metaloplastika 
 1982–83  Metaloplastika 
 1983–84  Metaloplastika 
 1984–85  Metaloplastika 
 1985–86  Metaloplastika 
 1986–87  Metaloplastika 
 1987–88  Metaloplastika 
 1988–89  Zagreb
 1989–90  Proleter
 1990–91  Zagreb
 1991–92  Proleter

Championships by club

European success
Traditionally one of the strongest handball leagues in Europe, several Yugoslav clubs went on to compete with considerable success in the European Cup (present-day EHF Champions League), the premier continental handball competition. Prior to the breakup of Yugoslavia, six Yugoslav clubs had managed to reach the European finals 11 times, winning four titles.

Notable clubs
(at least 10 top-flight seasons or at least one title)

Cham
Handball
1953 establishments in Yugoslavia
1992 disestablishments in Yugoslavia